Hóa An is a ward located in Biên Hòa city of Đồng Nai province, Vietnam. It has an area of about 6.8km2 and the population in 2017 was 28,968.

References

Bien Hoa